Badal Gupta ( Badol Gupto), real name Sudhir Gupta (1912 – 8 December 1930), was an Indian revolutionary against British rule in India, who is noted for launching an attack on the Secretariat Building - the Writers' Building in the Dalhousie square in Calcutta, along with Benoy Basu and Dinesh Gupta.

Early activities
Badal Gupta was born in the village Purba Shimulia (East Shimulia) in the Bikrampur region of Dhaka, now in Munshiganj District, Bangladesh. Badal Gupta was also influenced by the revolutionary activities of his two paternal uncles Late Dharaninath Gupta and Nagendranath Gupta, who were involved in the Alipore Bomb Case and were imprisoned along with Rishi Aurobindo Ghosh. Badal Gupta joined the Bengal Volunteers in 1928. He had also known Kanailal Bhattacharjee, who too was a Bengal Volunteer.

The battle at Writers' Building
Bengal Volunteers targeted Lt Col NS Simpson, the Inspector General of Prisons, who was infamous for the oppression of the prisoners in the jails. The revolutionaries decided not only to murder him, but also to strike a terror in the British official circles by launching an attack on the Secretariat Building - the Writers' Building in the Dalhousie square in Kolkata.

On 8 December 1930, Badal along with Dinesh Gupta and Benoy, dressed in European costume, entered the Writers' Building and shot dead Simpson. Police in the building started firing at them in response. What ensued was a brief gunfight between the three young revolutionaries and the police. Some other officers like Twynam, Prentice, and Nelson suffered injuries during the shooting.

Soon police overpowered them. However, the three did not wish to be arrested. Badal took Potassium cyanide, while Benoy and Dinesh shot themselves with their own revolvers. Badal died on the spot. He was only 18 years old during when this incident took place.

Significance
After independence, the Dalhousie Square was named B. B. D. Bagh - after the Benoy-Badal-Dinesh trio. In memory of their Writers' Building attack, a plate was engraved in the wall of Writers' Building, first floor.

References

Bibliography
 Hemendranath Dasgupta, Bharater Biplab Kahini, II & III, Calcutta, 1948;
 Ramesh Chandra Majumdar, History of the Freedom Movement in India, III, Calcutta 1963;
 Ganganarayan Chandra, Abismaraniya, Calcutta, 1966.
 Aamar Mama Badal Gupta: A memoir by Biswanath Dasgupta 2020

1912 births
1930 deaths
Revolutionaries of Bengal during British Rule
Anti-British establishment revolutionaries from East Bengal
People from Munshiganj District
Indian revolutionaries
People from Kolkata
Revolutionary movement for Indian independence
People from Bikrampur
Indian independence activists from West Bengal